The Light Model Tank No. 95 is a relic of the Japanese occupation of the US territory of Guam during World War II.  It is the remains of a Type 95 Ha-Go light tank, that was in a highly visible location on Cross Island Road when it was listed on the National Register of Historic Places in 1979.  At that time little more than the tank body remained, its turret and gun having been removed and sold for scrap.  It was at that time one of three such tanks known to survive on the island.

See also
National Register of Historic Places listings in Guam

References

World War II on the National Register of Historic Places in Guam